Max Landis (born August 3, 1985) is an American filmmaker and the son of director John Landis. He wrote scripts for the films Chronicle (2012), American Ultra (2015), Victor Frankenstein (2015), and Bright (2017). He wrote and directed the film Me Him Her (2015), produced the first two seasons of the Syfy series Channel Zero (2016), and created the series Dirk Gently's Holistic Detective Agency (2016) based on the novel, for BBC America. He has also written limited series published by DC and Image Comics.

In both 2011 and 2012, he was listed among Forbes magazine's "30 Under 30" young people to watch in the entertainment industry. His career stalled in 2017, following accusations from several women of emotional and sexual abuse.

Early life
Landis was born in Beverly Hills, California, the son of director John Landis (both share the same birthday) and costume designer and historian Deborah Nadoolman Landis. His family is Jewish. He left Beverly Hills High School for a therapeutic boarding school in Connecticut, but still graduated with a Beverly Hills High School diploma. Landis has stated that he has cyclothymia and dysgraphia.

Career
Max Landis appeared briefly in some of his father's films, including The Stupids, Blues Brothers 2000, and Burke and Hare. He started writing at 16, and sold his first script at the age of 18, a collaboration with his father on the Masters of Horror episode "Deer Woman". In 2008 he independently wrote an unaired episode for the series's second incarnation as Fear Itself. The same year, he wrote Back to Mysterious Island (based on the Jules Verne novel) for Bluewater Comics.

While attending the University of Miami, Landis wrote shorts which were produced by students in the school's film program. Upon leaving the university, he went on what one contemporary reporter called a "spec-selling streak", having three of his pitches optioned within six months. One of these was Good Time Gang, described as "a cross between The Bourne Identity and Jackass", which was not produced. He was hired in 2011 as screenwriter for Mr. Right, a violent romantic comedy released to mixed reviews in 2015.

He sold Chronicle, a script previously included on the Black List of promising unproduced screenplays, to 20th Century Fox's Davis Entertainment. Directed by Josh Trank, it was released in February 2012 to critical acclaim and commercial success. Landis wrote a draft for a sequel, but Fox was unhappy with it and the project was discontinued. Davis and Fox also bought Landis's script for a film based on Mary Shelley's Frankenstein, which became 2015's Victor Frankenstein.

Landis has written and directed two short comedic features released on YouTube. The Death and Return of Superman (2012) mockingly retells DC Comics' 1992–1993 story-line of Superman's death and revival, with scenes acted out by his friends and Hollywood actors. Wrestling Isn't Wrestling (2015) explains the nature of professional wrestling using the career of wrestler Triple H as an example, with several actors and wrestlers in cameos. Landis was later hired as a consultant for WWE Raw.

In September 2012, Landis sold a "superhero police drama" TV series titled Vigilant to Fox, and planned to executive produce it with Homeland producer Howard Gordon, but the project was cancelled. In 2012 Landis began work on his directorial debut, Me Him Her, which received a limited released in March 2016 to mixed reviews. The 2015 film American Ultra, based on his screenplay, received mixed reviews and disappointing box office results.

In February 2015, Landis directed Ariana Grande's music video "One Last Time". He was accused of plagiarizing the style and themes of the video from the music video for "You Are the One" by Australian band SAFIA.

In 2016, Netflix began production on Landis's script for Bright, then its most expensive self-produced film. Featuring magical fantasy characters such as orcs as an allegory for racism, the film was critically panned upon its release in December 2017, but Netflix reported that it was popular with its subscribers.

In September 2017, Landis published a website called "A Scar No One Else Can See", which contained a 150-page theory on the themes of Carly Rae Jepsen's songs, arguing that they present a dark, three-part narrative about heartbreak and rejection. Although Landis called the project a "celebration" of Jepsen, The Daily Dot and Pride.com described the document as a conspiracy theory, and Reid McCarter of The A.V. Club dismissed its conclusions as unremarkable.

Landis wrote a draft of the screenplay for Shadow in the Cloud (2020) before being removed from the project due to sexual assault allegations. Although the script was re-written by Roseanne Liang, he received credit per Writers Guild of America rules.

In February 2020, Landis announced Glass Planet Consulting, a "creative coaching and consulting resource for screenwriters living and working in Los Angeles".

Controversies

Landis has been criticized for statements he has made about women, and he has been accused of abuse and sexual misconduct by several women and industry figures.

Misogyny accusations 
In a 2013 interview with self-styled sexologist Shelby Sells, Landis made numerous comments about women, such as, "The most fucked up thing was that I cheated on a girl who I also gave a crippling social anxiety, self-loathing, body dysmorphia, eating disorder to." Landis's statements were sharply criticized as misogynist and objectifying of women, such as in a Jezebel piece which described his comments as "obnoxious", "twisted", and "gross".

In a 2015 Twitter post, Landis described the lead character Rey in Star Wars: The Force Awakens as a Mary Sue, a term originating in critiques of fan fiction to describe "a type of female character who is depicted as unrealistically lacking in flaws or weaknesses". He later stated in an interview that he stood by his criticism, but "I regret framing it that way. I didn't understand that the term Mary Sue had been co-opted."

Sexual assault allegations 
In December 2017, Landis was accused of sexual assault by former co-worker Anna Akana. MAD Magazine editor Allie Goertz had commented several weeks earlier that "I can't imagine who is more scared in a post-Weinstein world than a famous director's son," and various entertainment-industry figures commented in response about this person's bad reputation without naming him. Following Akana's statement, other industry figures confirmed Landis's reputation by name. Anti-harassment activist Zoë Quinn posted about him, alleging that his abuse of women was an "open secret" in Hollywood, and that they had been withholding the story because "him & his dad are powerful figures".

In June 2019, Landis's former girlfriend Whitney Moore posted on Twitter about him, referring to "horrific, inhumane things he did to me", and The Daily Beast published accusations from eight women about emotional and sexual abuse by him, one describing him as "a serial rapist, gaslighter, physical and psychological abuser". In a Twitter post expressing support for Landis's accusers, Chronicle director Josh Trank said that he had banned the writer from the set during filming. Landis's management company Writ Large and his manager Britton Rizzio stated that they had dropped him "as soon as they heard about" the Daily Beast story. After the news broke, MGM shelved production of Deeper, a film script by Landis the studio had previously won in a bidding war.

In August 2021, Landis published an essay titled "Why I Never Responded To My Public Shaming," in which he referred to the sexual assault accusations against him as "a somewhat corrupt enterprise," and rejected a comparison to Bill Cosby and Harvey Weinstein on the grounds that he was "not a real celebrity," while conceding "some of what's been said about me is true." He also discussed the therapy he sought following the accusations, and the public reaction to the fatal helicopter accident that occurred in 1982 on the set of his father's film Twilight Zone: The Movie.

Filmography

Film

Television

Short film

Web series

Music videos

Acting credits

Publications

References

External links

 

1985 births
2017 controversies
2017 controversies in the United States
American male screenwriters
Beverly Hills High School alumni
Jewish American writers
Living people
People from Beverly Hills, California
People with bipolar disorder
Sexual harassment in the United States
University of Miami alumni
Film directors from Los Angeles
Screenwriters from California
21st-century American Jews